Kottukal is a village in the taluk of Neyyattinkara, Thiruvananthapuram district, in the state of Kerala, India.

Demographics
 India census, Kottukal had a population of 45836 with 22741 males and 23095 females.

References

Villages in Thiruvananthapuram district